In England, Wales and Northern Ireland, a town traditionally was a settlement which had a charter to hold a market or fair and therefore became a "market town".  In Scotland, the equivalent is known as a burgh (pronounced ).  There are two types of burgh: royal burghs and burghs of barony.

The Local Government Act 1972 allows civil parishes in England and Wales to resolve themselves to be Town Councils, under section (245 subsection 6), which also gives the chairman of such parishes the title 'town mayor'.  Many former urban districts and municipal boroughs have such a status, along with other settlements with no prior town status.

In more modern times it is often considered that a town becomes a city (or a village becomes a town) as soon as it reaches a certain population, although this is an informal definition and no particular numbers are agreed upon.

The cultural importance placed on charters remains, and it is not an unusual event for towns across the UK to celebrate their charter in an annual Charter Day (normally a fair or medieval market).

Lists of towns in the United Kingdom
List of towns in England
 Lists of towns and cities in England by population
List of burghs in Scotland
List of towns in Wales
List of towns in Northern Ireland

List of major towns and cities in British Overseas Territories
Ranked by population:
 George Town, Cayman Islands (35,600)
 Gibraltar (29,431)
 Hamilton, Bermuda (13,500)
 West Bay, Cayman Islands (11,436)
 Bodden Town, Cayman Islands (10,341)
 Road Town, British Virgin Islands (9,400)
 Cockburn Town, Turks and Caicos Islands (3,700)
 Stanley, Falkland Islands (2,115)
St. George's Town, Bermuda (1,648)
Somerset Village, Bermuda (1,000)
 The Valley, Anguilla (1,169)
 Brades, Montserrat (approx. 1,000)

See also
List of cities in the United Kingdom
City status in the United Kingdom
List of places in the United Kingdom
List of urban areas in the United Kingdom

 

fr:Villes du Royaume-Uni